My War may refer to:

 My War, a 1984 Black Flag album
 My War (The Bear Quartet album), a 2000 album
 My War: Killing Time in Iraq, a 2005 book by Colby Buzzell
 My War (film), a 2016 Chinese historical war drama film
 "My War", called "Boku no Sensou" in Japanese, the opening theme for the anime Attack on Titan's fourth season.